Salome Jean White (1905 – 15 July 1974) was the first female flying medical doctor in Australia and the world when she commenced work with the Australian Inland Mission in May 1937. She was known as the Guardian Angel of the Gulf.

Early life and education
Salome Jean White was born in 1905. Her parents were John White ( - 26 January 1935), a school teacher, and Salome White (née Williams) ( - 15 June 1951) of 32 Havelock Road, Hawthorn. The family also owned a farm near Ballarat. She was the elder sister to John George Glyn White CBE (9 April 1909 - 2 November 1987) and Mary Margaret Freda White (later Guest), both of whom were also doctors.

White attended Melbourne High School and received a scholarship to attend University of Melbourne, where she graduated in 1929 with a Bachelor of Medicine, Bachelor of Surgery.

Career
She worked at the Royal Melbourne Hospital, Adelaide Children's Hospital, Crown Street Women's Hospital and Caulfield Convalescent Hospital before responding to an advertisement for doctors to work in remote areas of Australia.

She undertook four months of training at Cloncurry before being based with one nurse at Normanton. Together, with a pilot flying an aircraft donated by Qantas, they offered a seven-day aerial medical service covering 65,000 square miles of the Gulf Country. From September 1938, White was also supervising a newly opened nursing hospital at Dunbar Station.

References

1905 births
1974 deaths
20th-century Australian medical doctors
Australian women medical doctors
Australian medical doctors
Medical doctors from Melbourne
20th-century Australian women